Alessandro Pier Guidi (born December 18, 1983) is a racing driver from Italy. He drove two races for the Italian A1 Team. A Ferrari factory driver since 2017, he won LMGTE-PRO 2017 FIA World Endurance Championship and 2019 24 Hours of Le Mans, and 2021 24 Hours of Spa.

Pier Guidi drove a Ferrari 430 GT in the Spanish GT Championship and Italian GT Championship in 2005 and 2006, for the Scuderia Playteam. He won the 2005 Italian title, but missed out on the Spanish crown due to missing one race alongside team owner Giambasttista Giannocaro. In 2007 he moved to the FIA GT Championship, driving a Maserati MC12. He has also driven in the Italian Formula 3000 Championship.

In 2008 he drove the Galatasaray SK car in the Superleague Formula, scoring three podium finishes and taking the team to eighth overall in the final standings.

In 2014, driving a Level 5 Motorsport Ferrari F458 Italia, he won the GT Daytona (GTD) class at the Rolex 24 Hours of Daytona, one of the premier motor races in the American Tudor United SportsCar Championship.

In 2017, Ferrari reached a technical and racing agreement with Alessandro Pier Guidi. The Italian driver competed in the 2017 season of the FIA World Endurance Championship (WEC) pairing up with James Calado in the 488
GTE no. 51 managed on the track by the AF Corse team. Currently competing in the FIA World Endurance Championship for AF Corse, he is the current World Champion, alongside his fellow James Calado, in LMGTE Pro class, after winning the 2017 FIA World Endurance Championship.
Pier Guidi will thus join the other official Ferrari GT race drivers.

Racing record

Superleague Formula
(Races in bold indicate pole position) (Races in italics indicate fastest lap)

Complete GT1 World Championship results

Complete FIA World Endurance Championship results
(key) (Races in bold indicate pole position; races in
italics indicate fastest lap)

* Season still in progress.

Complete 24 Hours of Le Mans results

Complete WeatherTech SportsCar Championship results
(key) (Races in bold indicate pole position; results in italics indicate fastest lap)

United SportsCar Championship

2014 (GTD)
Level 5 Motorsports won the 2014 24 Hours of Daytona in the GT Daytona class with its No. 555 Ferrari 458 Italia GT3 of Scott Tucker, Townsend Bell, Bill Sweedler, Jeff Segal and Alessandro Pier Guidi, despite the car having initially been handed a penalty for late-race avoidable contact. IMSA reversed the call more than four hours after the race, declaring the No. 555 car the winners in GTD.

References

External links
Driver DB Profile
GT Open Database

 

Living people
A1 Team Italy drivers
Italian Formula Renault 2.0 drivers
Superleague Formula drivers
1983 births
FIA GT1 World Championship drivers
24 Hours of Daytona drivers
24 Hours of Le Mans drivers
Rolex Sports Car Series drivers
Superstars Series drivers
People from Tortona
Blancpain Endurance Series drivers
International GT Open drivers
Stock Car Brasil drivers
WeatherTech SportsCar Championship drivers
European Le Mans Series drivers
24 Hours of Spa drivers
British GT Championship drivers
FIA World Endurance Championship drivers
Sportspeople from the Province of Alessandria

AF Corse drivers
SMP Racing drivers
Level 5 Motorsports drivers
Ferrari Competizioni GT drivers
Iron Lynx drivers
GT4 European Series drivers